Harbor Beach Community Schools is the school district of the town Harbor Beach, Michigan. It consists of the grades Preschool through twelfth grade. The current address of Harbor Beach Community School is 402 South Fifth Street, Harbor Beach, MI. 48441. The school colors are orange and black; and the mascot is the pirate. Students may attend the Huron Area Technical Center in the eleventh and twelfth grade.

Extracurricular activities
Some extracurricular activities offered at Harbor Beach Community Schools are:

 Baseball and Softball Teams
 Board Game Club
 Boys and Girls Basketball Team
 Boys and Girls Soccer Team
 Cross-Country Team
 eSports
 Football Team
 Girls Volleyball Team
 Golf Team
 Harbor Beach Band
 Harbor Beach FFA Organization
 Pep Committee
 Postsecondary Action Council (PAC Squad)
 Programming Competition Team
 Quiz Bowl
 Student Council
 National Honor Society
 Track Team
 VEX Robotics Team

School achievements
 2012 State Football Champions

Harbor Beach statistics
Here are some statistics about the students attending the schools in Harbor Beach.

References

External links
 

Education in Huron County, Michigan
School districts in Michigan